A chronological list of films produced in Mauritania is presented below:

1960s
Soleil Ô (1969)

1970s
Les Bicots-negres vos voisins (1974), a.k.a. Arabs and Niggers, Your Neighbours
Nationalité immigré (1975)
Sahel la faim pourquoi (1975)
Faisons ensemble la patrie mauritanienne (1976)
Nous aurons toute la mort pour dormir (1977)
Safrana ou le droit à la parole (1978)
West Indies (1979)

1980s
Sarraounia (1986)

1990s
Oktyabr (1993)
Rostov-Luanda (1998)
La Vie Sur Terre (1998)
Watani, un monde sans mal (1998)

2000s
Waiting for Happiness (Heremakono) (2002)
En attendant les hommes (2007)

2010s
Timbuktu (2014)

External links
Mauritanian film at the Internet Movie Database

Mauritania